This is a list of episodes of the South Korean TV series Drama Stage (O'PENing). The show airs on tvN.

Series overview

Episodes

Season 1

Season 2

Season 3

Season 4

Season 5

Awards and nominations

Notes

References

External links
  

Lists of South Korean drama television series episodes
Drama Stage